Nevskia  is a Gram negative, strictly aerobic and motile genus of bacteria from the family Xanthomonadaceae.

References

Further reading 
 
 
 <
 

Xanthomonadales
Bacteria genera